The 26th European Film Awards were presented on 7 December 2013 in Berlin, Germany. The winners were selected by over 2,500 members of the European Film Academy. On 28 October 2013, a special seven-member jury convened in Berlin and, based on the EFA Selection list, decided on the winners in the categories cinematography, editing, production design, costume design, composer and sound design. On 4 November 2013, nominations for documentary were announced. The special documentary jury consist five members: Antonio Saura Despina Mouzaki, Claas Danielsen, Ally Derks and Jacques Laurent.

Winners and nominees

Best Film

People’s Choice Award

Discovery of the Year

Best Comedy

Best Director

Best Actor

Best Actress

Best Composer

Best Screenwriter

Best Cinematographer

Best Production Designer

Best Co-Production

Best Costume Designer

Best Editor

Best Sound Designer

Best Animated Feature Film

European Achievement in World Cinema

Lifetime Achievement Award

Best Documentary

Best Short Film

Young Audience Award

References

External links 
 

2013 film awards
European Film Awards ceremonies
Culture in Berlin
2013 in German cinema
2013 in Europe
2013 in Berlin